Jiovani Nacawili Jalalon (born August 2, 1992) is a Filipino professional basketball player who currently plays for the Magnolia Hotshots of the Philippine Basketball Association (PBA).

Early life
The third of the six children of Vicente Jalalon and Jocelyn Nacawili, Jiovani was born on August 2, 1992 to a poor family in Cagayan de Oro.

His inspiration in playing basketball is the unrealized dreams of his father, whose lack of a proper education and opportunities denied him of a chance of becoming a basketball player himself. Jiovani has a younger brother, Jericho, who also plays basketball.

Jalalon attended the Sacred Heart of Jesus Montessori School in Cagayan de Oro before he went to Manila to pursue a spot in a college varsity team.

College career
Jalalon first played college basketball for Informatics College in the National Athletic Association of Schools, Colleges and Universities (NAASCU), but later transferred to Arellano University to join the Chiefs in the National Collegiate Athletic Association (NCAA).

During his rookie year, he served as the chief backup to the Chiefs' main playmaker John Pinto. Though he was coming off the bench, Jalalon was the Chiefs’ fourth-leading scorer in the Filoil Flying V Premier Cup.

By his sophomore season, he averaged 12.8 points, 5.4 rebounds, 5.8 assists, and 2.8 steals, earning him the Most Improved Player Award and a spot in the NCAA Season 90 Mythical Five. Arellano made its first-ever NCAA Finals appearance, but eventually lost to five-peat champions San Beda Red Lions in two games.

Jalalon improved even more in his third year, making the Mythical Team once again. The Chiefs, however, failed to advance to the Final Four when they lost to the Mapua Cardinals in the playoff game for fourth spot despite Jalalon's 37 points, 7 rebounds, 5 assists, and 5 steals.

In the succeeding season, Arellano made a return to the NCAA Finals but lost once again to San Beda.

Jalalon played extremely well the entire season to clinch his third Mythical Team inclusion. He was the only non-center – and the only local player – to be part of the elite list. Mapua's Allwell Oraeme was named the league's Most Valuable Player (MVP), after accumulating 65.12 points in player all-around value (PAV) to beat Jalalon, who had 57.50 PAV.

The situation prompted the NCAA management to review the way individual awards are to be determined in the future, as many felt that there should have been a separate award for best import, so as to award the MVP to the best local player.

Even before he wrapped up his collegiate career, Jalalon had earned the reputation as the best point guard in Philippine college basketball. His style of play had also drawn comparison to that of PBA veteran, national player, and superstar point guard Jayson Castro.

Amateur career

Jalalon also played in the PBA Developmental League (PBA D-League) during the NCAA offseason. In the league's 2015 Foundation Cup, Jalalon suited up for KeraMix. He joined the Caida Tile Masters during the 2016 PBA D-League Aspirants' Cup.

Professional career

On October 30, 2016, Jalalon was picked by the Star Hotshots in the 2016 PBA draft.

He had an impressive PBA debut, putting up 11 points, five boards, one assist, and one steal in almost 22 minutes off the bench in the Hotshots’ 88–96 loss to San Miguel Beermen. The next game, Jalalon also puts up an impressive statline of numbers as he recorded 13 points, 6 rebounds, 5 assists and 1 steal in 27 minutes of playing time in a loss to the GlobalPort Batang Pier. In his third game, Jalalon have another impressive statline as he recorded 17 points, 5 rebounds and 5 steals in at least 24 minutes of playing time in a 99–75 win over the NLEX Road Warriors.

PBA career statistics

As of the end of 2021 season

Season-by-season averages
 
|-
| align=left | 
| align=left | Star
| 48 || 22.2 || .425 || .327 || .721 || 4.3 || 3.1 || 1.2 || .0 || 9.2
|-
| align=left | 
| align=left | Magnolia
| 54 || 23.8 || .380 || .234 || .641 || 4.7 || 5.0 || 1.7 || .0 || 8.4
|-
| align=left | 
| align=left | Magnolia
| 52 || 25.3 || .377 || .281 || .732 || 4.9 || 4.4 || 1.7 || .1 || 9.9
|-
| align=left | 
| align=left | Magnolia
| 12 || 23.2 || .417 || .286 || .765 || 4.2 || 3.3 || 1.4 || .1 || 8.6
|-
| align=left | 
| align=left | Magnolia
| 40 || 23.3 || .423 || .286 || .691 || 3.9 || 5.2 || 1.2 || – || 8.4
|-class=sortbottom
| align=center colspan=2 | Career
| 206 || 23.7 || .399 || .279 || .699 || 4.5 || 4.3 || 1.5 || .0 || 8.9

References

1992 births
Living people
Basketball players from Misamis Oriental
Magnolia Hotshots players
Arellano Chiefs basketball players
Philippine Basketball Association All-Stars
Philippines men's national basketball team players
Filipino men's basketball players
Point guards
Southeast Asian Games gold medalists for the Philippines
Southeast Asian Games medalists in basketball
Sportspeople from Cagayan de Oro
Competitors at the 2015 Southeast Asian Games
Magnolia Hotshots draft picks